Thanaron Point is a rock point on the east side of the end of Malorad Glacier, situated 8 nautical miles (15 km) east-northeast of Cape Roquemaurel on Trinity Peninsula, Antarctica. Named in 1838 by the French expedition under Captain Jules Dumont d'Urville after Lieutenant Charles Thanaron of the expedition ship Zelee.

Map
 Trinity Peninsula. Scale 1:250000 topographic map No. 5697. Institut für Angewandte Geodäsie and British Antarctic Survey, 1996.

Headlands of Trinity Peninsula